Mazar-i-Sharif Province is a defunct province of Afghanistan, which in 1964 was divided into Balkh Province and Jowzjan Province.  The former province's capital was Mazar-i-Sharif. 

As of 1946, it had a population of 944,020. In 1929, the province was governed by Khwajah Mir Alam, who had possibly been assigned the office in January 1929, during the events of the Afghan Civil War (1928–1929), when Habibullāh Kalakāni took control of Kabul.

References 
History of Balkh Province
History of Jowzjan Province
Former provinces of Afghanistan